Saint-Georges-de-l'Oyapock Airport  is an airport serving Saint-Georges (also known as Saint-Georges-de-l'Oyapock) in French Guiana. Saint-Georges lies on the Oyapock River, which forms the border between French Guiana and Brazil.

The Saint Georges non-directional beacon (Ident: GOP) is located on the field.

See also

 List of airports in French Guiana
 Transport in French Guiana

References

External links
OpenStreetMap - St Georges
Sky Vector - St Georges

Airports in French Guiana
Buildings and structures in Saint-Georges, French Guiana